A chansonnier (female: chansonnière) was a poet songwriter, a solitary singer, who sang his or her own songs (chansons) with a guitar, prominent in francophone countries during the 1960s and 1970s. Unlike popular singers, chansonniers need no artifice to sing their soul poetry. They performed in "Les Boites à Chansons" which flourished during those years. The themes of their songs varied but included nature, love, simplicity and a social interest to improve their world.

Canada
In Canada, the chansonnier tradition played a prominent role in the development of Quebec's social and political awareness during the Quiet Revolution, (la Révolution tranquille) that led to the affirmation of Quebecers' national identity. One prominent chansonnier, Robert Charlebois, transformed the province's musical culture when he moved from traditional chansonnier pop to a more rock-oriented sound with his fourth album, Lindberg, in 1968.

French-Canadian chansonniers
(listed alphabetically by surname)

 Geneviève Aubin-Bertrand
 Jacques Blanchet
 Hervé Brousseau
 Monique Brunet
 Pierre Calvé
 Christine Charbonneau
 Robert Charlebois
 Gervaises Desbiens-Roy
 Clémence Desrochers
 Serge Deyglun

 Lorainne Diot
 Georges Dor
 Jean-Pierre Ferland
 Jean-Paul Fillion
 Louise Forestier
 Claude Gauthier
 Marc Gélinas
 Suzanne Jacob
 Pauline Julien
 Mado de L'Isle

 Jacques Labrecque
 Georges Langford
 Christian Larsen
 Marie Lavigueur
 Félix Leclerc
 Tex Lecor
 Sylvain Lelièvre
 Jacqueline Lemay
 Pierre Létourneau
 Claude Léveillée

 Raymond Lévesque
 Monique Miville-Deschênes
 Priscilla
 Marie Savard
 Gilles Vigneault

References
 The reference used here is an exhaustive work on women songwriters in Quebec, which cover the period of 1960 to 1976. The female names that are listed above are those found in the chapter 9 'Les chansonnières', page 95 to 119, which correspond to the period of the cultural phenomenon). «La chanson écrite au féminin». An extensive research in musicology written by Cécile Tremblay-Matte.«La chanson écrite au féminin de Madeleine de Verchères à Mitsou 1730-1990», Éditions Trois, 2033 avenue Jessop, Laval, Québec. Diffusion pour le Canada, DMR, 3700 A boul. Saint-Laurent, Montréal, Québec, et pour l'Europe, Les Diffusions du Solstice, 363 B Chaussée de Waterloo, Bruxelles, Belgique. Données de catalogage avant publication (Canada)  .«La chanson écrite au féminin», Collection Trois Guinées dirigée par Anne-Marie Alonso. Dépot légal- BNQ, BNC troisième trimestre 1990, contient 391 pages.

Notes

Francophone music